Aleshki is a rural locality (a selo) and the administrative center of Aleshkovskoye Rural Settlement, Ternovsky District, Voronezh Oblast, Russia. The population was 958 as of 2010. There are 25 streets.

Geography 
Aleshki is located 16 km southeast of Ternovka (the district's administrative centre) by road. Narodnoye is the nearest rural locality.

References 

Rural localities in Ternovsky District
Borisoglebsky Uyezd (Tambov Governorate)